Dehydrogenase/reductase (SDR family) X-linked also known as DHRSX is an enzyme which in humans is encoded by the pseudoautosomal DHRSX gene. DHRSX is a member of the short-chain dehydrogenase family of oxidoreductase enzymes.

References

Further reading